Metarbela is a genus of moths in the family Cossidae described by William Jacob Holland in 1893.

Species
 Metarbela abdulrahmani Lehmann, 2008
 Metarbela alluaudi Le Cerf, 1914
 Metarbela bifasciata Gaede, 1929
 Metarbela bipuncta Hampson, 1920
 Metarbela bueana Strand, 1912
 Metarbela chidzingai Lehmann, 2008
 Metarbela cinereolimbata Le Cerf, 1914
 Metarbela costistrigata Hampson, 1920
 Metarbela cremorna Hampson, 1920
 Metarbela cymaphora Hampson, 1910
 Metarbela dialeuca Hampson, 1910
 Metarbela diodonta Hampson, 1916
 Metarbela distincta Le Cerf
 Metarbela erecta Gaede, 1929
 Metarbela fumida Karsch, 1896
 Metarbela funebris Gaede, 1929
 Metarbela haberlandorum Lehmann, 1997
 Metarbela inconspicua Gaede, 1929
 Metarbela kobesi Lehmann, 2007
 Metarbela laguna Hampson, 1920
 Metarbela latifasciata Gaede, 1929
 Metarbela leucostigma (Hampson, 1910)
 Metarbela lornadepewae Lehmann, 2009
 Metarbela micra Karsch, 1896
 Metarbela naumanni Mey, 2005
 Metarbela nubifera Bethune-Baker, 1909
 Metarbela ochracea Gaede, 1929
 Metarbela onusta Karsch, 1896
 Metarbela perstriata Hampson, 1916
 Metarbela plagifera Gaede, 1929
 Metarbela pygatula Strand, 1912
 Metarbela quadriguttata Aurivillius, 1925
 Metarbela rava Karsch, 1896
 Metarbela recticulosana Strand, 1912
 Metarbela rufa Gaede, 1929
 Metarbela shimonii Lehmann, 2008
 Metarbela simillima (Hampson, 1910)
 Metarbela sphacobapta Tams, 1929
 Metarbela stivafer Holland, 1893
 Metarbela taifensis Wiltshire, 1988
 Metarbela triangularis Gaede, 1929
 Metarbela triguttata Aurivillius, 1905
 Metarbela trisignata Gaede, 1929
 Metarbela tuckeri Butler, 1875
 Metarbela vaualba Hampson, 1920
 Metarbela weinmanni Lehmann, 2007

Former species
 Metarbela albitorquata Hampson, 1910
 Metarbela arcifera Hampson, 1909
 Metarbela flavicolor Janse, 1925
 Metarbela heringi Janse, 1930
 Metarbela iridescens Janse, 1925
 Metarbela marginemaculata Gaede
 Metarbela neurosticta (Hampson, 1910)
 Metarbela pagana Strand, 1909
 Metarbela pallescens Le Cerf, 1914
 Metarbela splendida D. S. Fletcher, 1968

References

 , 1997: Metarbela haberlandorum sp. nov., a new moth from Kenya (Lepidoptera: Metarbelidae). Nachrichten Entomologische Verein Apollo 18 (1): 45–53.
 , 2007: Metarbelidae. Esperiana Buchreihe zur Entomologie Memoir 4: 169–185.
 , 2008: Ten new species of Metarbelidae (Lepidoptera: Cossoidea) from the coastal forests and the Eastern Arc Mountains Of Kenya and Tanzania, including one species From Two Upland Forests. Journal of East African Natural History 97 (1): 43–82. DOI: 10.2982/0012-8317(2008)97[43:TNSOML]2.0.CO;2. Abstract: .
 , 2008: Six New Species of Metarbelidae (Lepidoptera: Cossoidea) from the Eastern Arc Mountains of Tanzania, Including One New Species from Marenji Forest in Southeast Coastal Kenya. Journal of East African Natural History 97 (2): 187–206. DOI: 10.2982/0012-8317-97.2.187. Abstract: .
 , 2005: Metarbela naumanni sp. nov. from southern Africa (Lepidoptera: Cossidae: Metarbelinae). Entomologische Zeitschrift 115 (1): 10–12.

External links

Metarbelinae